Leah Hayes (born October 21, 2005) is an American swimmer, currently swimming for the Illinois-based team Fox Valley Park District Riptides.

Early life and career 
At the age of 10, Hayes would earn her first national age group record in the 200m freestyle.

Career

2018 
In 2018, Hayes was featured on Sports Illustrated Kids as the 2018 SportsKid of the Year.

2019 
In 2019, it was announced that Hayes would start attempting national meets in order to get Olympic Time Trial cut times. In June, Hayes earned an Olympic Time Trials cut time at the 2019 Swim Pink A+ Invite in the 400m individual medley.

2021 
In 2021, Hayes would swim in the 2020 United States Olympic trials in the 100m freestyle, the 200m individual medley, and the 400m individual medley. However, she would fail to qualify for the 2020 Summer Olympics in all three events.

2022 
On April 26, it was announced that Hayes had suffered a stress fracture in her foot. However, she would still compete in the 2022 USA Swimming International Team Trials.

At Trials, Hayes managed to qualify for both the 200m and the 400m individual medley. While Hayes came fourth in the 400m behind Katie Grimes, Emma Weyant, and Hali Flickinger, Hayes was able to get herself into second place in the 200m, thus qualifying her for the USA Worlds team. and competed in the 2022 World Aquatics Championships in the women's 200m individual medley. Hayes, in an interview, was reportedly in shock at making the team, saying "To make the team, it’s definitely quite a surprise... As we were getting our pictures taken and I was standing with all these incredible athletes, I was like, ‘Oh my gosh.’ I had a conversation with Katie Ledecky and with Lilly King. What in the world?"

Hayes was added to the roster of the 2022-2023 U.S. National Team by USA Swimming.

Personal life 
Hayes was born to parents Jill and Tim Hayes. Hayes was diagnosed at the age of six with alopecia, a condition that causes hair loss. Hayes currently attends Kaneland High School, and is scheduled to graduate in 2024.

References 

2005 births
Living people
American female medley swimmers
21st-century American women
Sportspeople from Kane County, Illinois
World Aquatics Championships medalists in swimming